The 2013 Girls Youth Volleyball World Championship was held in Nakhon Ratchasima, Thailand, from 26 July to 4 August 2013. This was the first edition of the tournament that features 20 teams.



Qualification process

 * Pan-American Volleyball Union

Competition formula

Venues

Preliminary round

Pool A

|}

|}

Pool B

|}

|}

Pool C

|}

|}

Pool D

|}

|}

Final round

Championship Bracket

Round of 16 

|}

Quarter-finals 

|}

Semi-finals 

|}

Bronze medal match 

|}

Gold medal match 

|}

5th–8th places bracket

Classification 5th and 8th

|}

Classification 7th 

|}

Classification 5th 

|}

9th–16th places bracket

13th and 16th places bracket

Classification 9th and 16th

|}

Classification 13th and 16th

|}

Classification 9th and 12th

|}

Classification 15th 

|}

Classification 13th 

|}

Classification 11th 

|}

Classification 9th 

|}

Classification 17th and 20th 

|}

|}

Final standing

All-Star Team

Most Valuable Player

Best Middle Blockers

Best Opposite

Best Setter

Best Outside Hitters

Best Libero

See also
 2013 FIVB Boys Youth World Championship

References

World Youth Championship
FIVB Girls Youth World Championship
FIVB Volleyball Girls' U18 World Championship
Nakhon Ratchasima
International volleyball competitions hosted by Thailand